The Loving Ones (Spanish:Las cariñosas) is a 1979 Mexican comedy film directed by Rafael Portillo.

Cast
 Juan Alonso 
 Pepe Arévalo 
 Carlos Bravo y Fernandez 
 Yari Caballero as Fichera  
 Víctor Manuel Castro 
 Arturo Cobo
 Luis de Alba 
 Yadira Del Valle as Fichera  
 Leandro M. Espinosa 
 Susana Galli as Fichera  
 Joaquín García Vargas 
 Mayte Gerald 
 Christian Grants as Fichera  
 Barbara Ham as Fichera  
 Rafael Inclán 
 Jessica Kuri as Fichera  
 Rossy Lamarque as Fichera  
 Jazmin Lee as Fichera
 Sonia Lima as Fichera  
 Marina 
 Lyn May 
 Mayka 
 Sasha Montenegro 
 Yara Moreno as Fichera  
 Mike Moroff 
 Vicky Nevarez as Fichera  
 Yolanda Perkins as Fichera  
 Sonia Piña 
 Jorge Rivero 
 Gabriela Ríos 
 Carmen Salinas 
 Alfredo Solares 
 Enrique Sánchez 
 Manuel 'Loco' Valdés 
 Isela Vega 
 Gabriela Villeli as Fichera  
 Alfonso Zayas

References

Bibliography 
 Charles Ramírez Berg. Cinema of Solitude: A Critical Study of Mexican Film, 1967-1983. University of Texas Press, 2010.

External links 
 

1979 films
1979 comedy films
Mexican comedy films
1970s Spanish-language films
Films directed by Rafael Portillo
1970s Mexican films